Ali Topaloğlu (born 1998) is a Turkish world and European champion track and field athlete with Down syndrome. He is a member of Canik Belediyespor in Samsun.

Ali Topaloğlu started playing sports at the age of fifteen motivated by his father. Since 2014, he has been competing at international championships and has won several gold medals.

He won the silver medal in the Mosaic discus event at the 2017 IAADS European Athletics Championships held in Vila Nova de Gaia, Portugal. At the 2018 World Championships for Athletes with Down Syndrome in Madeira, Portugal, he became world champion in the shot put event and won two silver medals in discus and 200 m. He became the European champion and set a world record in the shot put event of the 2019 Open European Championships for Athletes with Down Syndrome in Tampere, Finland.

Achievements

References

1998 births
Living people
Turkish Muslims
People from Canik
Sportspeople from Samsun
Turkish disabled sportspeople
Sportspeople with Down syndrome
Turkish male shot putters
Turkish male discus throwers
Turkish male sprinters